Luigi Suppa (died  29 September 1569) was a Roman Catholic prelate who served as Bishop of Agrigento (1565–1569).

Biography
Luigi Suppa was ordained a priest in the Order of Preachers.
On 13 April 1565, he was appointed by Pope Pius IV as Bishop of Agrigento. 
He served as Bishop of Agrigento until his death on 29 September 1569.

References

External links and additional sources
 (for Chronology of Bishops)
 (for Chronology of Bishops) 

16th-century Roman Catholic bishops in Sicily
Bishops appointed by Pope Pius IV
Dominican bishops
1569 deaths